Cham Takleh-ye Olya (also Romanized as Cham Takleh-ye ‘Olyā and Cham Tagaleh-ye ‘Olyā; also known as Cham Tagaleh and Cham Takleh) is a village in Honam Rural District, in the Central District of Selseleh County, Lorestan Province, Iran. At the 2006 census, its population was 169, in 40 families.

References 

Towns and villages in Selseleh County